Monte Walsh is a 2003 American Western television film directed by Simon Wincer and starring Tom Selleck, Isabella Rossellini, and Keith Carradine. It was adapted from Jack Schaefer's 1963 novel Monte Walsh. This film is a remake of the 1970 Monte Walsh film that starred Lee Marvin.

Monte Walsh is the quintessential cowboy—the last of a dying breed. His story takes place in the waning years of the "Old West," near the end  of the 19th century. Two long-time cowboys, Monte and his best friend Chet, have their lives on the range inexorably changed by the coming modernity and a fellow cowboy who becomes involved with rustling, robbery, and killing.

The film premiered on TNT on January 17, 2003.

Overview
Set in Wyoming and filmed in Alberta, Canada, Monte Walsh is a remake of the 1970 theatrical film Monte Walsh that starred Lee Marvin. The script is nearly word-for-word identical to the original (original screenwriters David Zelag Goodman and Lukas Heller are credited) and a lot of set-ups and shots are the same as well, but Selleck plays a much more amiable and kind Walsh, to the point that some of the harsher lines attributed to Marvin's Walsh are given to other characters to soften the title character's personality to match Selleck's more affable style.

Plot
In 1892 in Antelope Junction, Wyoming Territory, Montelius "Monte" Walsh (Tom Selleck) is an aging cowboy facing the final days of the Wild West era. He and his friend Chet Rollins (Keith Carradine), another long-time cowhand, work at whatever ranch work comes their way, but "nothing they can't do from a horse". Their lives are divided between months on the range and the occasional trip into town. Camaraderie and competition with the other cowboys fill their days. They seek work and take a job at the ranch of Cal Brennan (William Devane), where they meet an old friend, Shorty Austin (George Eads), another ranch hand.

Monte has a long-term relationship with an old flame, prostitute and saloon girl "Countess" Martine Bernard (Isabella Rossellini), who suffers from tuberculosis. Chet, meanwhile, has fallen in love with Mary Wilder (Lori Hallier), a widow who owns a hardware store. As barbed wire and railways steadily eliminate the need for the cowboy, Monte and his friends are left with fewer and fewer options. New work opportunities are available to them, but the freedom of the open prairie is what they long for. Shorty loses his job and gets involved in rustling and killing, gunning down a local lawman. Then Monte and Chet find that their lives on the range are inexorably redirected.

Chet marries Mary and goes to work in the store, telling Monte that their old way of life is simply disappearing. Caught up in the spirit of the moment, Monte asks Martine to marry him, and she accepts. Monte goes on a drinking binge and rides a wild bay horse that even Shorty could not tame through town, causing considerable damage.

A rodeo owner, Colonel Wilson (Wallace Shawn), sees him and offers him a job. Monte considers the high salary, but decides the work is too degrading and refuses. Eventually, they all must say goodbye to the lives they knew, and try to make a new start. When Shorty shoots and kills Chet while trying to rob the store, Monte, distraught after the death of his beloved Martine, goes after him.

Shorty arrives, and it is apparent that he knows of the fight to come with his former friend. He tells Monte he is sorry to hear of Martine's death, and walks off. Perhaps trying to give Monte a choice to kill him or walk away. Monte, unable to shoot Shorty in the back as he walks away, pursues. Shorty makes a long shot with a pistol at Monte, but runs off when the shot only wounds Monte in the left side. Monte then manages to slip around Shorty and shoots him. As Shorty is dying, Monte tells him that he rode the wild bay horse.

Seven years pass and Monte returns from working all over the West. His friends have gotten older, prices are rising, and he is seen by the townspeople as a relic of another time. However, one little boy asks for lessons in roping. When the accountant who manages the lands he used to ranch drives his primitive car into a mud puddle and asks for help, Monte jumps his horse over the vehicle and rides away.

Cast

 Tom Selleck as Monte Walsh
 Isabella Rossellini as Martine
 Keith Carradine as Chet Rollins
 George Eads as Shorty Austin
 Robert Carradine as Sunfish Perkins
 Barry Corbin as Bob Alderson
 James Gammon as Fightin' Joe Hooker
 Rex Linn as Hat Henderson
 John Michael Higgins as Robert Slocumb
 William Sanderson as Skimpy Eagens
 Wallace Shawn as Colonel Wilson
 Marshall Teague as Dally Johnson
 Rick Ravanello as Sugar Wyman
 Joanna Miles as Sairy Brennan
 Lori Hallier as Mary Wilder
 Matt Cooke as Rufus Brady
 Ken Pogue as Old Doctor
 Zack Ward as Powder Kent
 William Devane as Cal Brennan

 Shane Pollitt as Joe Joslin
 Tom Edwards as Plump Lawyer
 Tom Glass as The Marshal
 Tim Koetting as Stocky Barman
 Bruce McFee as Burly Man
 Marty Antonini as Farmer
 Eric Keenleyside as Engineer
 Terry King as Trainman
 Peter Skagen as Fireman
 Michael Tod as Boy
 Gillian Carfra as Young Woman

Production

Filming locations
 CL Western Studio & Backlot, Cochrane, Alberta, Canada
 CL Ranch, 45001 Township Road, Calgary, Alberta, Canada
 Longview, Alberta, Canada
 Redwater, Alberta, Canada

Reception

Awards and nominations
 2003 Emmy Award Nomination for Outstanding Sound Editing for a Miniseries, Movie or a Special
 2004 Western Heritage Awards Bronze Wrangler for Outstanding Television Feature Film

References

External links
 
 
 
 

2003 television films
2003 films
2003 Western (genre) films
TNT Network original films
American Western (genre) television films
Films directed by Simon Wincer
Films set in 1892
Films set in 1900
2000s English-language films